Headfirst into Happiness is a 1931 German comedy film directed by Hans Steinhoff and starring Jenny Jugo, Fritz Schulz and S. Z. Sakall. A separate French-language version Everybody Wins was also produced. Such Multiple-language versions were common during the early years of sound before dubbing became more widespread.

It was shot at the Joinville Studios in Paris. The film's sets were designed by the art director Jacques Colombier.

Cast
Jenny Jugo as Madeleine
Fritz Schulz as Marcel Durant
Alexa Engström  as Baronin Clairisse Monteuil
S. Z. Sakall as Baron Monteuil
Berthe Ostyn as Jvonne Linné
Kurt Lilien
Truus Van Aalten as Lily
Austin Egen
Gisa Bergmann
Albert Paulig
Luigi Bernauer
Eugen Rex

References

External links

1931 comedy films
German comedy films
Films of the Weimar Republic
Films directed by Hans Steinhoff
German multilingual films
Films scored by Nico Dostal
German black-and-white films
1933 multilingual films
Films set in Paris
Films shot at Joinville Studios
1930s German films